A mass path is a pedestrian track or road connecting destinations frequently used by rural communities, traditionally leading to a church celebrating Sunday Mass. They were most common during the centuries that preceded motorised transportation in Western Europe, and in particular the British Isles, and the Netherlands (where such a path is called kerkenpad (lit. “church path”). 

Mass paths typically included stretches crossing the fields of neighbouring farmers, and were likely to contain stiles when crossing fences or other boundaries; plank bridges were used to cross ditches.

Some mass paths are still used today in the Republic of Ireland, but are usually subject to Ireland's complicated rights of way law.

See also 
 Stile

Notes

Footpaths

Catholic Church in Ireland
Social history of Ireland
History of transport in Ireland
Geographic history of Ireland